Rory Hutchinson (born 29 January 1995) is a Scotland international rugby union player currently playing with Northampton Saints.

Club career
Rory Hutchinson plays predominantly at centre. He began his rugby career at National League 2 South side Shelford RFC. 

He joined the Saints' Academy in July 2014. Hutchinson made his senior debut for the club on 31 January 2015, aged just 19 as Saints played local rivals Leicester Tigers.

The centre went on to make his Aviva Premiership debut against Exeter Chiefs in September 2016. Hutchinson scored the club's try of the season in Saints' tight one point victory over their guest.

Since 2017 Hutchinson has been a regular for the Saints' senior side.  In 2019 he was part of the team that won the Premiership Cup v Saracens.  He won the Gallagher Premiership Player on the month in February 2019 and has been nominated several times since then.

International career
Rory Hutchinson first represented Scotland at U18 level. After having impressed at under-18 level, the centre was called up into the under-20 team. Playing in the IRB Junior World Cup in New Zealand  Hutchinson went on to play in 2 further U20 World Cups and 2 U20 Six Nations series. He fell just one appearance short of the all-time record for number of appearance for the Scotland U20 side, playing 20 times for the country at that level.

He received his first full senior cap from the bench for Scotland in the World Cup warm-up match against France on 17 August 2019. He has gone on to gain a further 6 caps and scored 3 tries.

References 

1996 births
Living people
Scottish rugby union players
Northampton Saints players
Rugby union players from Cambridge
Scotland international rugby union players
Rotherham Titans players
Rugby union centres
Anglo-Scots